The Jinju Formation is an Early Cretaceous geologic formation in South Korea. Dinosaur remains are among the fossils that have been recovered from the formation, although none have yet been referred to a specific genus. The depositional age of this formation spans from approximately 112.4 ± 1.3 to 106.5 million years ago (Albian) based on detrital zircon U-Pb dating. It predominantly consists of black shale, with sandstone packets, deposited in a fluvial-lacustrine setting.

A diverse spider fauna is known from the formation, including indeterminate mygalomorphs and palpimanoids as well as two species of lagonomegopid belonging to the genera Koreamegops and Jinjumegops. Other compression fossils known from the formation include a species of the zhangsolvid fly Buccinatormyia, the elaterid beetle Koreagrypnus, and the ichthyodectiform fish Jinjuichthys. This formation has also "attracted global ichnological attention" for the variety of important ichnofossils. Columnar and rod-shaped stromatolites have also been found here.

Fossil content

Flora

Spiders

Insects 
Jinju formation consists of a diverse order of insects: Orthoptera, Homoptera, Mantodea, Diptera, Coleoptera, Hymenoptera, Dermaptera, Neuroptera, Blattoidea, Hemiptera, Odonata, Mecoptera, etc. A larvae fossil of aquatic insect has also been discovered.

Orthoptera

Odonata

Raphidioptera

Blattodea

Coleoptera

Diptera

Dermaptera

Neuroptera

Termites

Crustaceans

Isopoda

Ostracoda

Spinicaudata

Vertebrates

Actinopterygii

Archosauria

Mollusks

Bivalvia

Gastropoda

Ichnofossils

See also 
 :ko:경상 분지 (Gyeongsang Basin)
 Geology of South Korea#Gyeongsang Basin
 List of dinosaur- bearing rock formations
 List of stratigraphic units with indeterminate dinosaur fossils

References

Bibliography 

 
 

Geologic formations of South Korea
Lower Cretaceous Series of Asia
Cretaceous South Korea
Albian Stage
Sandstone formations
Shale formations
Fluvial deposits
Lacustrine deposits
Paleontology in South Korea